Sweden competed at the 1988 Summer Paralympics in Seoul, South Korea. 103 competitors from Sweden won 103 medals including 42 gold, 38 silver and 23 bronze and finished 6th in the medal table.

See also 
 Sweden at the Paralympics
 Sweden at the 1988 Summer Olympics

References 

1988
1988 in Swedish sport
Nations at the 1988 Summer Paralympics